Arhopaloscelis maculatus is a species of beetle in the family Cerambycidae. It was described by Bates in 1877. It is known from Japan and Taiwan.

References

Desmiphorini
Beetles described in 1877